Several Japanese ships have been named Tokiwa:
 ,  of the Imperial Japanese Navy launched in 1898; converted into a minelayer in the 1920s; beached in 1945 after an attack by US Navy fighters; scrapped in 1947

Japanese Navy ship names